In January 2019, Gov. Mike Parson signed Executive Order 19-03 to move the Division of Workforce Development and the Missouri Economic Research and Information Center (MERIC) under the Department of Higher Education. The department transformation became legally effective on Aug. 28, 2019, when Governor Parson signed Executive Order 19-15, to form the Missouri Department of Higher Education and Workforce Development.

See also 
Education in Missouri
List of colleges and universities in Missouri
Missouri Research and Education Network
List of unaccredited institutions of higher education

References 

 Official Website for Department of Higher Education & Workforce Development.

External links 
 Official Website
Publications by or about the Missouri Department of Higher Education at Internet Archive.
Publications by or about the Missouri Department of Higher Education and Workforce Development at Internet Archive.

Public education in Missouri
State agencies of Missouri